The 1985–86 Liga Bet season saw Hapoel Bnei Tamra, Hapoel Tayibe, Hapoel Tira and Hapoel Ramla win their regional divisions and promoted to Liga Alef.

At the bottom, Hapoel Abu Snan, Hapoel Nahariya (from North A division), Maccabi Zikhron Ya'akov, Hapoel Baqa al-Gharbiyye (from North B division), Hapoel Mahane Yehuda, Maccabi Ramat HaSharon (from South A division), Beitar Lod and Maccabi Be'er Sheva (from South B division) were all automatically relegated to Liga Gimel.

North Division A

Hapoel Nahariya withdrew from the league and did not show up for their first two opening matches of the season.

North Division B

South Division A

South Division B

References
Promoted to Liga Alef: Bnei Tamra, Tira, Tayibe and Ramla Maariv, 18.5.86, Historical Jewish Press 

Liga Bet seasons
Israel
4